Cheryshev is a Russian masculine surname, its feminine counterpart is Cherysheva. It may refer to:

 Denis Cheryshev (born 1990), Russian football player
 Dmitri Cheryshev (born 1969), Russian football player, father of Denis

Russian-language surnames